Jonathan Erlich and Andy Ram were the defending champions, but Erlich chose not to participate due to an elbow injury, and only Ram competed that year.Ram partnered with Max Mirnyi, but lost to Feliciano López and Fernando Verdasco in the second round.

Bob Bryan and Mike Bryan won in the final, 2–6, 7–5, 6–0, against Mahesh Bhupathi and Mark Knowles.

Seeds

Draw

Finals

Top half

Section 1

Section 2

Bottom half

Section 3

Section 4

External links
 2009 Australian Open – Men's draws and results at the International Tennis Federation

Men's Doubles
Australian Open (tennis) by year – Men's doubles